Kazi Mozammel Haque is a Bangladesh Awami League politician and the former Member of Parliament of Dhaka-17.

Career
Haque was elected to parliament from Dhaka-17 as a Bangladesh Awami League candidate in 1973.

References

Awami League politicians
Living people
1st Jatiya Sangsad members
Year of birth missing (living people)